Robert Grant (born 31 January 1996) is an American-born Italian sprinter, specialized in the 400 metres hurdles and 400 metres.

Biography
Robert Grant was born in Phoenix, Arizona and attended Brophy College Preparatory. He is a multiple-time NCAA All-American in both the 400m hurdles and  relay. His eligibility was for the United States until 20 July 2020 and he was eligible to represent Italy national team from 21 July  With a time of 3:01.39 on 10 March 2018 he set the world record in the 4x400 meters relay indoor by competing for Texas A&M at the 2018 NCAA Division I Indoor Track and Field Championships.

World records
 4x400 metres relay indoor: 3:01.39 ( College Station, Texas, 10 March 2018 with Ilolo Izu, Devin Dixon, Mylik Kerleyo)

Achievements
Senior level

National Championship Results

References

External links
 

Texas A&M Aggies men's track and field athletes
Track and field athletes from Phoenix, Arizona
1996 births
Italian male hurdlers
American male sprinters
Italian male sprinters
Living people
Italian people of American descent